The World Pool Masters is an annual international nine-ball tournament. Formerly, it was called the European Pool Masters (until 1995) until players from other parts of the globe were invited.

History
Throughout much of its history, the tournament has been featuring sixteen world-class pool players, competing in single-elimination format. In 2010, the number of players was doubled to 32. The first round of the event was played in double elimination with the second round in single-elimination.

In 2011, the tournament reverted to the original 16-player single-elimination format, with each match a race-to-8, winner breaks. The 2011 edition was held in SM North EDSA Mall in Quezon City, Metro Manila, Philippines. Ralf Souquet of Germany won the said tournament for the record-setting sixth time, beating defending champion Dennis Orcollo of the Philippines, 8–5.

For the 2019 World Pool Masters, the field was changed to accompany 24 players, with seeded players being given a bye through the first round.

Winners

Records 
 Ralf Souquet holds the record for winning the World Pool Masters the most times: six. (1994, 1996, 2000, 2002, 2006, 2011).
 Shane Van Boening holds the record for the most consecutive wins: two. (2014, 2015).
 The oldest pool player to ever win the tournament to date is Ralf Souquet of Germany, at 42 years old at the time of his victory, The youngest is Daryl Peach of United Kingdom, aged 23 years old at the time of his victory.

Top Performers

 Active participants are shown in bold.
 In the event of identical records, players are sorted in alphabetical order by first name.

References

External links
 Official site
 Tournament History of the World Pool Masters
 Pictures from the 2011 World Pool Masters
 Pictures from the 2010 World Pool Masters
 World Pool Masters News

 
Pool competitions
Recurring sporting events established in 1993